Tormod Frostad (born 29 August 2002) is a Norwegian freestyle skier.

He competed in the big air at the 2022 Winter Olympics.

References

External links
 
 
 
 

2002 births
Living people
Norwegian male freestyle skiers
Freestyle skiers at the 2022 Winter Olympics
Olympic freestyle skiers of Norway
Freestyle skiers at the 2020 Winter Youth Olympics